Egocentric presentism is a form of solipsism introduced by Caspar Hare in which other persons can be conscious, but their experiences are simply not .

Similarly, in related work, Hare argues for a theory of perspectival realism in which other perspectives do exist, but the present perspective has a defining intrinsic property.

In one example that Hare uses to illustrate his theory (starting on page 354 of the official version of his paper), you learn that you are one of two people, named A and B, who have just been in a train crash; and that A is about to have incredibly painful surgery. You cannot remember your name. Naturally, you hope to be B! This example is easily handled by egocentric presentism because under this theory, the case where the present experiences are A's is fundamentally different from the case where the present experiences are B's. Hare points out that similar examples can be given to support theories like presentism in the philosophy of time.

Several other philosophers have written reviews of Hare's work on this topic.  Giovanni Merlo has given a detailed comparison to his own closely related subjectivist theory, and Christian List to his many-worlds theory of consciousness.

See also
 Centered worlds
 Benj Hellie's vertiginous question
 J. J. Valberg's personal horizon
 Further facts
 Indexicality
 Presentism (literary and historical analysis)

References

External links
 Hare, Caspar. Self-Bias, Time-Bias, and the Metaphysics of Self and Time. Preprint of article in The Journal of Philosophy (2007).
 Hare, Caspar. On Myself, and Other, Less Important Subjects. Early draft of book published by Princeton University Press (2009).
 Hare, Caspar. Realism About Tense and Perspective. Preprint of article in Philosophy Compass (2010).

Epistemological theories
Metaphysics of mind
Philosophy of time
Theory of mind